Kerry Werner (born March 27, 1991) is an American cyclist who rides for the Kona Maxxis Shimano cyclocross team and previously rode for .

Major results

Cyclo-cross

2012–2013
 North Carolina Grand Prix
1st Race 2
2nd Race 1
 Supercross Cup
1st Day 2
3rd Day 1
2013–2014
 2nd Kingsport Cyclo-cross Cup
 3rd Days 1 & 2, Supercross Cup
2014–2015
 1st Races 1 & 2, North Carolina Grand Prix
 1st Baystate Cyclo-cross - NECX
 Supercross Cup
1st Day 2
3rd Day 1
 NEPCX - NBX Gran Prix of Cross
2nd Day 2
3rd Day 1
 3rd Race 3, Jingle Cross
2015–2016
 2nd Kingsport Cyclo-cross Cup
 2nd Day 1, Supercross
2016–2017
 1st Races 1 & 2, DCCX
 2nd Race 1, Charm City Cross
 3rd National Championships
 3rd Ruts n' Guts Day 2
 3rd Derby City Cup
2017–2018
 1st Race 2, Rochester Cyclocross
 1st Races 1 & 2, North Carolina Grand Prix
 1st Races 1 & 2, DCCX
 1st Day 1, Supercross
 2nd Ruts n' Guts Day 1
 3rd National Championships
 3rd Derby City Cup
2018–2019
 1st Cincinnati UCI Cyclocross - Carter Park
 1st Race 1, Nittany Lion Cross
 1st Race 1, North Carolina Grand Prix
 1st Races 1 & 2, Deschutes Brewery's GO Cross
 1st Races 1 & 2, DCCX
 Charm City Cross
1st Race 1
2nd Race 2
 2nd Days 1 & 2, Supercross
 Rochester Cyclocross
2nd Race 1
3rd Race 2
 3rd  Pan American Championships
 3rd NBX GP of Cross 1
 3rd Cincinnati UCI Cyclocross - Devou Park
2019–2020
 1st  Pan American Championships
 1st Races 1 & 2, North Carolina Grand Prix
 1st Race 1, Charm City Cross
 Virginia's Blue Ridge GO Cross
1st Race 2
2nd Race 1
 FayetteCross
1st Race 1
3rd Race 2
 DCCX
1st Race 1
2nd Race 2
 Cincinnati UCI Cyclocross - Kingswood Park
1st Race 1
2nd Race 2

References

External links
 
 
 

1991 births
Living people
American male cyclists
Cyclo-cross cyclists
Cross-country mountain bikers